IWK may refer to:

IWK Health Centre
Indah Water Konsortium
Indigenous Weather Knowledge
Industrie-Werke Karlsruhe
Initiativen Wirtschaft für Kunst
Institut für Wiener Klangstil (Institute for Viennese Sound Style IWK)
 IATA code for Marine Corps Air Station Iwakuni